Ina Šarčević (born March 18, 1959) is a Yugoslav-American theoretical astrophysicist who studies high-energy cosmic particles, especially neutrinos, and the implications of particle physics for dark matter and cosmology. She is a professor of physics and of astronomy at the University of Arizona.

Education and career
Šarčević graduated in 1981 from the University of Sarajevo, and completed her Ph.D. in physics in 1986 at the University of Minnesota. Her doctoral advisor was Bernice Durand.

After postdoctoral research at the Los Alamos National Laboratory, she joined the University of Arizona faculty as an assistant professor of physics in 1988. She became an associate professor in 1993 and full processor in 1999, adding a second affiliation as professor of astronomy in 2008.

Recognition
Šarčević was named a Humboldt Fellow in 1989. She was elected as a Fellow of the American Physical Society (APS) in 2006, after a nomination from the APS Division of Particles and Fields, "for outstanding contributions to physics of ultrahigh-energy neutrinos and cosmic rays".

Personal life
Šarčević was married to Zlatko Tesanovic, a condensed-matter physicist at Johns Hopkins University who died in 2012.

References

External links
Home page

1959 births
Living people
American astrophysicists
American women physicists
Women astrophysicists
Yugoslav emigrants to the United States
University of Sarajevo alumni
University of Minnesota alumni
University of Arizona faculty
Fellows of the American Physical Society